The Murder Man is a 1935 American crime-drama film starring Spencer Tracy, Virginia Bruce, and Lionel Atwill, and directed by Tim Whelan. The picture was Tracy's first film in what would be a twenty-year career with MGM. Tracy plays an investigative reporter who specializes in murder cases. The film is notable as the feature film debut of James Stewart (who had previously appeared in a Shemp Howard comedy short called Art Trouble). Stewart has sixth billing as a reporter named Shorty.

Plot

Steve Grey (Spencer Tracy) is a hotshot New York newspaper reporter specializing in murder. When a crooked businessman named Halford is murdered, Steve pins the blame on the dead man's associate, Henry Mander (Harvey Stephens), theorizing that Halford was killed by a rifle from a shooting gallery across the street.

Mander is arrested, tried, convicted and sentenced to death. Steve visits his father, who is depressed because his business has been ruined. The hard-working, hard-drinking Steve is urged by Mary (Virginia Bruce), a gossip columnist who loves him, to take some time off.

Another colleague, Shorty (James Stewart), arrives to tell Steve that their editor wants an exclusive interview with Mander in prison. He goes to Sing Sing to conduct the interview.

Driven by guilt, Steve shocks everyone by confessing to having committed the murder himself, as revenge for Halford and Mander having ruined his father. Steve's last act is to tell his editor that he's got his biggest story ever.

Cast

 Spencer Tracy as Steve Grey
 Virginia Bruce as Mary
 Lionel Atwill as Capt. Cole
 Harvey Stephens as Henry Mander
 Robert Barrat as Robins
 James Stewart as Shorty
 William Collier, Sr. as Pop Grey
 Bobby Watson as Carey Booth
 William Demarest as Red Maguire
 John Sheehan as Sweeney
 Lucien Littlefield as Rafferty
 George Chandler as Sol Hertzberger
 Fuzzy Knight as Buck Hawkins
 Louise Henry as Lillian Hopper
 Robert Warwick as Colville
 Joe Irving as Tony
 Ralph Bushman as Pendleton

Reception
Writing for The Spectator, Graham Greene praised Tracy's acting, describing his portrayal of Steve Grey as "as certain as a mathematical formula" and noting that the scene of confrontation between Grey and Henry Mander (portrayed by Harvey Stephens) gave Tracy the chance "of showing the reserve of power behind the ease".

Box office
According to MGM records the film earned $344,000 in the US and Canada and $202,000 elsewhere resulting in a profit of $184,000.

References

External links

See also
 1935 in film

1935 films
1935 crime drama films
American crime drama films
American black-and-white films
Films about journalists
Films directed by Tim Whelan
Metro-Goldwyn-Mayer films
Films produced by Harry Rapf
1930s English-language films
1930s American films